Puffy can refer to:

 Puffy, stage name of Sean Combs (born 1969), American rapper and entrepreneur
 Puffy, nickname of Mike Bordin (born 1962), American drummer for the rock band Faith No More
 Puffy, nickname of Jeff Dubay (born 1968), Minnesota sports talk radio personality
 Charles Puffy (1884–1942/1943), Hungarian film actor
 Puffy or Puffy AmiYumi, a Japanese pop duo
 Puffy: P.S. I Love You, 1999 PlayStation game featuring Puffy AmiYumi
 Puffy (mascot), the mascot of the free operating system OpenBSD
 Puffy Lake, a lake in Manitoba, Canada – see Sherridon, Manitoba

See also 
 Puffy planet, a class of gas giant planets that have a very low density
 Puff (disambiguation)